Olha Opanasivna Petliura (née: Bilska; 23 December 1885 - 23 November 1959) was a spouse of Ukrainian political leader Symon Petliura. She graduated from the Higher Courses for Women, Kyiv.

Biography
Olha Bilska was born on 23 December 1885.
In 1908, while she was in Kyiv, she met Symon Petliura. In 1910, they married and the couple took an active part in the life of the Ukrainian diaspora in Moscow, arranging concerts and literary evenings.
In 1911, they had a daughter, Ukrainian poet, Lesya Petliura.

In 1924, the settled in Paris. Olha did embroidery work in order to ensure a decent living for her family.

On 25 May 1926 Symon was shot dead by a SPD agent Sholom Schwartzbard. This greatly affected Olga's health: she fell ill and began to lose her hearing. In addition, her daughter fell ill and continued to live with this illness until 1941, after which she died at the age of under 30 years. Subsequently, her remains were transferred to the cemetery of Montparnasse and buried in the neighborhood with the grave of her father, Symon.

Olga Petliura died on 23 November 1959. She was buried in a family grave at the Montparnasse cemetery near her husband and daughter.

References

1885 births
1959 deaths
People from Poltava Governorate
First Ladies of Ukraine
19th-century educators
Ukrainian translators
20th-century translators